The 1970 Philadelphia Eagles season was their 38th in the league. They failed to improve on their previous output of 4–9–1, winning only three games. The team failed to qualify for the playoffs for the tenth consecutive season.

The Eagles did have victories over the playoff-bound Dolphins and the cross-state rival Steelers (in Franklin Field's swan song as an NFL venue), as well as a 23–20 victory on Monday Night Football over the Giants, ending New York's six-game winning streak and helping deny Big Blue a playoff berth.

Offseason

Draft

Roster

Regular season

Schedule 

Note: Intra-division opponents are in bold text.

Game recaps

Week 1 vs Cowboys

Week 2 

    
    
    
    
    
    
    

The game got off to bad start when Chicago Bears kickoff returner Cecil Turner had a 96-yard game opening kickoff return for a touchdown. Mark Moseley would miss the extra point when the Eagles answered with a touchdown of their own later in the 1st quarter meaning that they were not losing the game only from the opening kickoff to the time it took Turner to return it. Three times during the game the Bears would lead the Eagles by one point.

Week 8 

    
    
    
    
    
    
    

In week 8 the Eagles marked their first time playing a former AFL team in the regular season by winning 24–17 for their 1st win of the 1970 season. The defense of Philadelphia would force the Miami quarterbacks (Bob Griese 3 and John Stofa 1) to throw 4 interceptions. Miami kick returner Mercury Morris would average over 26 yards on 4 kickoff returns.

Week 9 

    
    
    
    
    
    

The Eagles did not score an offensive touchdown, but an aggressive defense harassed Atlanta quarterback Bob Berry for most of the game and scored a touchdown of its own when Steve Preece returned a fumble 21 yards after Gary Pettigrew blindsided Harmon Wages on an attempted halfback option pass. Philadelphia had a chance to win the game in the closing seconds, but Mark Moseley blew a chip shot field goal attempt.

Week 10

Week 14 

    
    
    
    
    
    
    
    
    

In week 14 the Eagles played the cross state rival Pittsburgh Steelers in the final NFL game at Franklin Field. Frenchy Fuqua had two long runs for touchdowns, one for 72 yards and another for 85 yards, both in the first half. Mark Moseley would miss his 3rd extra point of the year. His 14th field goal of the year, out of 25 attempted, in the 4th quarter gave the Eagles the lead for good. He would be cut during the 1971 training camp, play for the Houston Oilers for 13 games over two years, then settle in Washington for 10 years becoming the last straight on kicking style kicker left in the NFL. He won the Most Valuable Player Award during the strike-shortened 1982 season. He is the only placekicker to win the award.

Standings

Playoffs 
The Eagles failed to make the playoffs for the 1970 season.

References 

Philadelphia Eagles seasons
Philadelphia Eagles
Philadel